Dallemagne is a surname. Notable people with the surname include:

Augustine Dallemagne (1821–1875), French miniature painter
Claude Dallemagne (1754–1813), French commander during the Napoleonic Wars
Georges Dallemagne (born 1958), Belgian politician and doctor
Marcel Dallemagne (born 1898), French professional golfer